The A. Malin House is a private house located at 54 Bridge Street in Petoskey, Michigan. It was placed on the National Register of Historic Places in 1986.

The A. Malin House is a two-story frame Queen Anne house with an intersecting gable roof. A front gable faces the street and a shed roofed side porch covers two entrances. A rear porch fills the angle between the gables, and a single story addition projects to the rear. The windows are one-over-one units with simple cornices.

The A. Malin House was constructed some time before 1899, when A. Malin lived here. By 1903, Robert Kepsel and Peter Myers, a laborer, live in the house. Charles Rice, a cook, moved in by 1917 and lived here until at least 1926.

References

Houses on the National Register of Historic Places in Michigan
Queen Anne architecture in Michigan
Emmet County, Michigan